This is the 8th season that the Eastern Conference team called the Boston Cannons play in their home games at Harvard Stadium. They were selected on host the 8th annual Major League Lacrosse Steinfeld Cup championship weekend at Harvard Stadium on August 23 to August 24. The opening game of the season is at home against New Jersey Pride.

Standings
W = Wins, L = Losses, PCT = Winning Percentage, GF = Goals For, GA  Goals Against

 =Qualified for championship weekend

Regular season schedule

External links 
 Boston Cannons official site

References

Lacrosse teams in Boston
Major League Lacrosse seasons
Boston Cannons Season, 2008
2008 in sports in Massachusetts